SMB (SubMiniature version B) connectors are coaxial RF connectors developed in the 1960s. SMB connectors are smaller than SMA connectors.

They feature a snap-on coupling and are available in either 50 Ω or 75 Ω impedance. They offer excellent electrical performance from DC to 4 GHz.

An SMB jack has a male center pin, while an SMB plug has a female basket.

Connectors are available for two SMB cable sizes: 
 Cable 2.6/50+75 S (3 mm outer / 1.7 mm inner diameter) and 
 Cable 2/50 S (2.2 mm outer / 1 mm inner diameter)

SSMB
The SSMB connector is a small version of the standard SMB connector with a 'snap-on' coupling.
 Impedance: 50 Ohm
 Operating frequency: DC–12.4 GHz

See also
 SMA connector, SMC connector
 BNC connector, TNC connector, N connector

References

Sources
 MIL-C-39012
 MIL-STD-348
 MIL-STD-202

External links

Image of SMB and Mini SMB 75 Ω plugs

RF connectors